Koleje Małopolskie (Lesser Poland Railways) is a regional rail operator in the Lesser Poland Voivodeship of Poland.

History
The company was founded on 2 December 2013 and is owned by the Lesser Poland Voivodeship, to handle local passenger traffic in the Voivodeship. It started operations on 6 November 2014. The railway was founded to reduce the congestion on the Kraków - Wieliczka line, reducing the travel time to 21 minutes. The Wieliczka Salt Mine connection is considered to be the main 
popular station, the local council built a new Park & Ride near Wieliczka Park and Wieliczka Rynek railway stations.

Rolling stock

Railway lines

From the 14 December 2014 Koleje Małopolskie will transport passengers on the route  Kraków Główny – Wieliczka Rynek-Kopalnia with modern and air conditioned trains. The travel time is 21 minutes, and the train will begin the route at 05:00 to 23:00 every thirty minutes. In 2015 after the railway will be renovated the route will extend to Kraków Balice which has direct access to the John Paul II International Airport.

In the future Koleje Małopolskie will expand together with the Kraków High Speed Agglomeration Railway, which will gain three new routes:

 Trzebinia – Kraków Główny – Tarnów
 Sędziszów – Kraków Główny – Podbory Skawińskie
 Kraków Balice – Kraków Główny – Wieliczka Rynek-Kopalnia

References

Companies based in Kraków
Railway companies established in 2013